The class IV f locomotives of the Grand Duchy of Baden State Railway were express locomotives with a 4-6-2 (Pacific) wheel arrangement. They later passed to the Deutsche Reichsbahn, who classified them as class 18.2. These were the first Pacific locomotives in Germany and the second in Europe after the Paris-Orléans Railway 4500-series that had appeared a few months earlier.

History 
The locomotives were produced in four batches between 1907 and 1913. The first batch of three locomotives was built in 1907 by Maffei. The remaining 32 locomotives were then manufactured under license in three batches by the Maschinenbau-Gesellschaft Karlsruhe.

Maffei had already won the competition for the new locomotive in 1905. However, the preparation of the plans was delayed until 1907. When designing the locomotive, Maffei succeeded in synthesizing the German and American locomotive building traditions. The 4-6-2 wheel arrangement and the bar frame were adopted from America, while four-cylinder compound engines of the Borries type and the sleek design are of German origin

Because the locomotives were to be used both on the flat Rhine Valley route and in the mountains on the Odenwald and Black Forest railways, they had a driving wheel diameter of only . They proved to be unsuitable for the intended operation in the flatlands. The small driving wheel diameter for express steam locomotives led to comparatively high revolutions per minute. This led to greater stress on the engine, which often resulted in damage.

In 1925, the Deutsche Reichsbahn took over only 22 of the 35 built locomotives as class 18.2. They were given the road numbers 18 201, 18 211 to 18 217, 18 231 to 18 238 and 18 251 to 18 256. The high-maintenance locomotives were withdrawn by 1930 – significantly earlier than the other German Pacific classes.

In 1961 Deutsche Reichsbahn gave the newly rebuilt locomotive 18 201 its number as a nod to the first German Pacific locomotive.

Construction 
The long boiler was riveted and consisted of three courses. The steam dome and sand dome sat on the front boiler course. The superheater was of the Schmidt type. The boiler and the cylinder blocks were clad in sheet metal.

In order to accommodate a large grate area, it was moved behind the coupled axles. However, this made it necessary to install a trailing axle. The front and rear of the firebox were tilted forward for a better centre of gravity.

From the 1912 delivery series onwards, this device was not installed.

The low-pressure cylinders were on the outside, the high-pressure cylinders on the inside. All four cylinders worked on the second coupled axle. To facilitate starting, a Maffei type bypass valves were installed to permit high pressure steam to be admitted to the low pressure cylinders.

References 

 

4-6-2 locomotives
04 f
Standard gauge locomotives of Germany
Maffei locomotives
Railway locomotives introduced in 1907
Maschinenbau-Gesellschaft Karlsruhe locomotives
2′C1′ h4v locomotives
Passenger locomotives